Andreyevka is the name of several inhabited localities in Russia.

Altai Krai
As of 2010, two rural localities in Altai Krai bear this name:
Andreyevka, Shipunovsky District, Altai Krai, a settlement in Zerkalsky Selsoviet of Shipunovsky District
Andreyevka, Slavgorodsky District, Altai Krai, a selo in Maksimovsky Selsoviet of Slavgorodsky District

Amur Oblast
As of 2010, one rural locality in Amur Oblast bears this name:
Andreyevka, Amur Oblast, a selo in Andreyevsky Rural Settlement of Ivanovsky District

Republic of Bashkortostan
As of 2010, ten rural localities in the Republic of Bashkortostan bear this name:
Andreyevka, Arkhangelsky District, Republic of Bashkortostan, a village in Orlovsky Selsoviet of Arkhangelsky District
Andreyevka, Aurgazinsky District, Republic of Bashkortostan, a selo in Tukayevsky Selsoviet of Aurgazinsky District
Andreyevka, Birsky District, Republic of Bashkortostan, a village in Kusekeyevsky Selsoviet of Birsky District
Andreyevka, Blagoveshchensky District, Republic of Bashkortostan, a village in Nikolayevsky Selsoviet of Blagoveshchensky District
Andreyevka, Ilishevsky District, Republic of Bashkortostan, a selo in Andreyevsky Selsoviet of Ilishevsky District
Andreyevka, Kugarchinsky District, Republic of Bashkortostan, a village in Zarechensky Selsoviet of Kugarchinsky District
Andreyevka, Mishkinsky District, Republic of Bashkortostan, a village in Kayrakovsky Selsoviet of Mishkinsky District
Andreyevka, Miyakinsky District, Republic of Bashkortostan, a village in Novokaramalinsky Selsoviet of Miyakinsky District
Andreyevka, Pervomaysky Selsoviet, Yanaulsky District, Republic of Bashkortostan, a village in Pervomaysky Selsoviet of Yanaulsky District
Andreyevka, Yamadinsky Selsoviet, Yanaulsky District, Republic of Bashkortostan, a selo in Yamadinsky Selsoviet of Yanaulsky District

Belgorod Oblast
As of 2010, three rural localities in Belgorod Oblast bear this name:
Andreyevka, Chernyansky District, Belgorod Oblast, a selo in Chernyansky District
Andreyevka (Kholodnyanskoye Rural Settlement), Prokhorovsky District, Belgorod Oblast, a selo in Prokhorovsky District; municipally, a part of Kholodnyanskoye Rural Settlement of that district
Andreyevka (Prelestnenskoye Rural Settlement), Prokhorovsky District, Belgorod Oblast, a selo in Prokhorovsky District; municipally, a part of Prelestnenskoye Rural Settlement of that district

Bryansk Oblast
As of 2010, two rural localities in Bryansk Oblast bear this name:
Andreyevka, Navlinsky District, Bryansk Oblast, a village in Klyukovensky Selsoviet of Navlinsky District
Andreyevka, Surazhsky District, Bryansk Oblast, a village in Andreyevsky Selsoviet of Surazhsky District

Chelyabinsk Oblast
As of 2010, one rural locality in Chelyabinsk Oblast bears this name:
Andreyevka, Chelyabinsk Oblast, a village in Petrovsky Selsoviet of Uvelsky District

Chuvash Republic
As of 2010, two rural localities in the Chuvash Republic bear this name:
Andreyevka, Ibresinsky District, Chuvash Republic, a village in Andreyevskoye Rural Settlement of Ibresinsky District
Andreyevka, Shemurshinsky District, Chuvash Republic, a village in Shemurshinskoye Rural Settlement of Shemurshinsky District

Republic of Dagestan
As of 2010, one rural locality in the Republic of Dagestan bears this name:
Andreyevka, Republic of Dagestan, a selo in Pervomaysky Selsoviet of Derbentsky District

Irkutsk Oblast
As of 2010, one rural locality in Irkutsk Oblast bears this name:
Andreyevka, Irkutsk Oblast, a village in Tulunsky District

Ivanovo Oblast
As of 2010, one rural locality in Ivanovo Oblast bears this name:
Andreyevka, Ivanovo Oblast, a village in Lezhnevsky District

Kaluga Oblast
As of 2010, one rural locality in Kaluga Oblast bears this name:
Andreyevka, Kaluga Oblast, a village in Dzerzhinsky District

Kemerovo Oblast
As of 2010, one rural locality in Kemerovo Oblast bears this name:
Andreyevka, Kemerovo Oblast, a selo in Yelykayevskaya Rural Territory of Kemerovsky District

Kostroma Oblast
As of 2010, two rural localities in Kostroma Oblast bear this name:
Andreyevka, Kadyysky District, Kostroma Oblast, a village in Stolpinskoye Settlement of Kadyysky District
Andreyevka, Sudislavsky District, Kostroma Oblast, a village in Voronskoye Settlement of Sudislavsky District

Kursk Oblast
As of 2010, four rural localities in Kursk Oblast bear this name:
Andreyevka, Fatezhsky District, Kursk Oblast, a village in Kolychevsky Selsoviet of Fatezhsky District
Andreyevka, Gorshechensky District, Kursk Oblast, a village in Soldatsky Selsoviet of Gorshechensky District
Andreyevka, Kastorensky District, Kursk Oblast, a village in Andreyevsky Selsoviet of Kastorensky District
Andreyevka, Medvensky District, Kursk Oblast, a khutor in Vyshnedubovetsky Selsoviet of Medvensky District

Lipetsk Oblast
As of 2010, two rural localities in Lipetsk Oblast bear this name:
Andreyevka, Dobrinsky District, Lipetsk Oblast, a village in Tikhvinsky Selsoviet of Dobrinsky District
Andreyevka, Lebedyansky District, Lipetsk Oblast, a village in Kuymansky Selsoviet of Lebedyansky District

Mari El Republic
As of 2010, one rural locality in the Mari El Republic bears this name:
Andreyevka, Mari El Republic, a village in Mikhaylovsky Rural Okrug of Sovetsky District

Republic of Mordovia
As of 2010, six rural localities in the Republic of Mordovia bear this name:
Andreyevka, Ardatovsky District, Republic of Mordovia, a selo in Kelvyadinsky Selsoviet of Ardatovsky District
Andreyevka, Atyashevsky District, Republic of Mordovia, a selo in Andreyevsky Selsoviet of Atyashevsky District
Andreyevka, Bolsheignatovsky District, Republic of Mordovia, a selo in Andreyevsky Selsoviet of Bolsheignatovsky District
Andreyevka, Kovylkinsky District, Republic of Mordovia, a village in Primokshansky Selsoviet of Kovylkinsky District
Andreyevka, Andreyevsky Selsoviet, Temnikovsky District, Republic of Mordovia, a village in Andreyevsky Selsoviet of Temnikovsky District
Andreyevka, Zhegalovsky Selsoviet, Temnikovsky District, Republic of Mordovia, a village in Zhegalovsky Selsoviet of Temnikovsky District

Moscow Oblast
As of 2010, two inhabited localities in Moscow Oblast bear this name.

Urban localities
Andreyevka, Solnechnogorsky District, Moscow Oblast, a work settlement in Solnechnogorsky District

Rural localities
Andreyevka, Kolomensky District, Moscow Oblast, a village in Nepetsinskoye Rural Settlement of Kolomensky District

Nizhny Novgorod Oblast
As of 2010, six rural localities in Nizhny Novgorod Oblast bear this name:
Andreyevka, Bogorodsky District, Nizhny Novgorod Oblast, a village in Shapkinsky Selsoviet of Bogorodsky District
Andreyevka, Gaginsky District, Nizhny Novgorod Oblast, a settlement in Bolshearatsky Selsoviet of Gaginsky District
Andreyevka, Pilninsky District, Nizhny Novgorod Oblast, a village in Deyanovsky Selsoviet of Pilninsky District
Andreyevka, Sergachsky District, Nizhny Novgorod Oblast, a selo in Andreyevsky Selsoviet of Sergachsky District
Andreyevka, Sokolsky District, Nizhny Novgorod Oblast, a village in Loyminsky Selsoviet of Sokolsky District
Andreyevka, Sosnovsky District, Nizhny Novgorod Oblast, a village in Krutetsky Selsoviet of Sosnovsky District

Novosibirsk Oblast
As of 2010, two rural localities in Novosibirsk Oblast bear this name:
Andreyevka, Bagansky District, Novosibirsk Oblast, a selo in Bagansky District
Andreyevka, Kuybyshevsky District, Novosibirsk Oblast, a village in Kuybyshevsky District

Omsk Oblast
As of 2010, six rural localities in Omsk Oblast bear this name:
Andreyevka, Lyubinsky District, Omsk Oblast, a village in Bogolyubovsky Rural Okrug of Lyubinsky District
Andreyevka, Okoneshnikovsky District, Omsk Oblast, a village in Andreyevsky Rural Okrug of Okoneshnikovsky District
Andreyevka, Omsky District, Omsk Oblast, a selo in Andreyevsky Rural Okrug of Omsky District
Andreyevka, Sargatsky District, Omsk Oblast, a selo in Andreyevsky Rural Okrug of Sargatsky District
Andreyevka, Sedelnikovsky District, Omsk Oblast, a village in Golubovsky Rural Okrug of Sedelnikovsky District
Andreyevka, Tavrichesky District, Omsk Oblast, a village in Neverovsky Rural Okrug of Tavrichesky District

Orenburg Oblast
As of 2010, ten rural localities in Orenburg Oblast bear this name:
Andreyevka, Abdulinsky District, Orenburg Oblast, a selo in Malosurmetsky Selsoviet of Abdulinsky District
Andreyevka, Adamovsky District, Orenburg Oblast, a selo in Terensaysky Selsoviet of Adamovsky District
Andreyevka, Akbulaksky District, Orenburg Oblast, a selo in Shkunovsky Selsoviet of Akbulaksky District
Andreyevka, Belyayevsky District, Orenburg Oblast, a selo in Klyuchevsky Selsoviet of Belyayevsky District
Andreyevka, Grachyovsky District, Orenburg Oblast, a settlement in Verkhneignashkinsky Selsoviet of Grachyovsky District
Andreyevka, Kurmanayevsky District, Orenburg Oblast, a selo in Andreyevsky Selsoviet of Kurmanayevsky District
Andreyevka, Sakmarsky District, Orenburg Oblast, a selo in Belousovsky Selsoviet of Sakmarsky District
Andreyevka, Saraktashsky District, Orenburg Oblast, a selo in Petrovsky Selsoviet of Saraktashsky District
Andreyevka, Aksenkinsky Selsoviet, Severny District, Orenburg Oblast, a village in Aksenkinsky Selsoviet of Severny District
Andreyevka, Rychkovsky Selsoviet, Severny District, Orenburg Oblast, a village in Rychkovsky Selsoviet of Severny District

Oryol Oblast
As of 2010, three rural localities in Oryol Oblast bear this name:
Andreyevka, Karlovsky Selsoviet, Kolpnyansky District, Oryol Oblast, a village in Karlovsky Selsoviet of Kolpnyansky District
Andreyevka, Krasnyansky Selsoviet, Kolpnyansky District, Oryol Oblast, a village in Krasnyansky Selsoviet of Kolpnyansky District
Andreyevka, Kromskoy District, Oryol Oblast, a village in Apalkovsky Selsoviet of Kromskoy District

Penza Oblast
As of 2010, four rural localities in Penza Oblast bear this name:
Andreyevka, Kamensky District, Penza Oblast, a selo in Golovinshchinsky Selsoviet of Kamensky District
Andreyevka, Pachelmsky District, Penza Oblast, a village in Novotolkovsky Selsoviet of Pachelmsky District
Andreyevka, Penzensky District, Penza Oblast, a selo in Pokrovo-Berezovsky Selsoviet of Penzensky District
Andreyevka, Zemetchinsky District, Penza Oblast, a village in Krasnodubravsky Selsoviet of Zemetchinsky District

Perm Krai
As of 2010, three rural localities in Perm Krai bear this name:
Andreyevka, Kungursky District, Perm Krai, a village in Kungursky District
Andreyevka, Okhansky District, Perm Krai, a selo in Okhansky District
Andreyevka, Ordinsky District, Perm Krai, a village in Ordinsky District

Primorsky Krai
As of 2010, two rural localities in Primorsky Krai bear this name:
Andreyevka, Khasansky District, Primorsky Krai, a selo in Khasansky District
Andreyevka, Yakovlevsky District, Primorsky Krai, a selo in Yakovlevsky District

Ryazan Oblast
As of 2010, three rural localities in Ryazan Oblast bear this name:
Andreyevka, Miloslavsky District, Ryazan Oblast, a settlement in Pavlovsky Rural Okrug of Miloslavsky District
Andreyevka, Pitelinsky District, Ryazan Oblast, a village in Veryayevsky Rural Okrug of Pitelinsky District
Andreyevka, Sarayevsky District, Ryazan Oblast, a village in Alexeyevsky Rural Okrug of Sarayevsky District

Samara Oblast
As of 2010, two rural localities in Samara Oblast bear this name:
Andreyevka, Bogatovsky District, Samara Oblast, a selo in Bogatovsky District
Andreyevka, Koshkinsky District, Samara Oblast, a village in Koshkinsky District

Saratov Oblast
As of 2010, nine rural localities in Saratov Oblast bear this name:
Andreyevka, Arkadaksky District, Saratov Oblast, a station in Arkadaksky District
Andreyevka, Atkarsky District, Saratov Oblast, a village in Atkarsky District
Andreyevka, Balakovsky District, Saratov Oblast, a selo in Balakovsky District
Andreyevka, Baltaysky District, Saratov Oblast, a village in Baltaysky District
Andreyevka, Marksovsky District, Saratov Oblast, a selo in Marksovsky District
Andreyevka, Turkovsky District, Saratov Oblast, a selo in Turkovsky District
Andreyevka, Voskresensky District, Saratov Oblast, a village in Voskresensky District
Andreyevka (selo), Yekaterinovsky District, Saratov Oblast, a selo in Yekaterinovsky District
Andreyevka (village), Yekaterinovsky District, Saratov Oblast, a village in Yekaterinovsky District

Smolensk Oblast
As of 2010, four rural localities in Smolensk Oblast bear this name:
Andreyevka, Gagarinsky District, Smolensk Oblast, a village in Pokrovskoye Rural Settlement of Gagarinsky District
Andreyevka, Kholm-Zhirkovsky District, Smolensk Oblast, a village in Tomskoye Rural Settlement of Kholm-Zhirkovsky District
Andreyevka, Roslavlskoye Rural Settlement, Roslavlsky District, Smolensk Oblast, a village in Roslavlskoye Rural Settlement of Roslavlsky District
Andreyevka, Zharynskoye Rural Settlement, Roslavlsky District, Smolensk Oblast, a village in Zharynskoye Rural Settlement of Roslavlsky District

Sverdlovsk Oblast
As of 2010, one rural locality in Sverdlovsk Oblast bears this name:
Andreyevka, Sverdlovsk Oblast, a village in Sysertsky District

Tambov Oblast
As of 2010, eleven rural localities in Tambov Oblast bear this name:
Andreyevka, Michurinsky District, Tambov Oblast, a village in Zavoronezhsky Selsoviet of Michurinsky District
Andreyevka, Muchkapsky District, Tambov Oblast, a village in Zapolatovsky Selsoviet of Muchkapsky District
Andreyevka, Nikiforovsky District, Tambov Oblast, a village in Yekaterininsky Selsoviet of Nikiforovsky District
Andreyevka, Gavrilovsky Selsoviet, Rzhaksinsky District, Tambov Oblast, a village in Gavrilovsky Selsoviet of Rzhaksinsky District
Andreyevka, Zolotovsky Selsoviet, Rzhaksinsky District, Tambov Oblast, a village in Zolotovsky Selsoviet of Rzhaksinsky District
Andreyevka, Sampursky District, Tambov Oblast, a village in Satinsky Selsoviet of Sampursky District
Andreyevka, Sosnovsky District, Tambov Oblast, a selo in Andreyevsky Selsoviet of Sosnovsky District
Andreyevka, Staroyuryevsky District, Tambov Oblast, a village in Vishnevsky Selsoviet of Staroyuryevsky District
Andreyevka, Bolshelipovitsky Selsoviet, Tambovsky District, Tambov Oblast, a village in Bolshelipovitsky Selsoviet of Tambovsky District
Andreyevka, Dubrovsky Selsoviet, Tambovsky District, Tambov Oblast, a village in Dubrovsky Selsoviet of Tambovsky District
Andreyevka, Tokaryovsky District, Tambov Oblast, a village in Alexandrovsky Selsoviet of Tokaryovsky District

Republic of Tatarstan
As of 2010, five rural localities in the Republic of Tatarstan bear this name:
Andreyevka, Alexeyevsky District, Republic of Tatarstan, a village in Alexeyevsky District
Andreyevka, Bugulminsky District, Republic of Tatarstan, a selo in Bugulminsky District
Andreyevka, Cheremshansky District, Republic of Tatarstan, a village in Cheremshansky District
Andreyevka, Novosheshminsky District, Republic of Tatarstan, a village in Novosheshminsky District
Andreyevka, Nurlatsky District, Republic of Tatarstan, a selo in Nurlatsky District

Tomsk Oblast
As of 2010, one rural locality in Tomsk Oblast bears this name:
Andreyevka, Tomsk Oblast, a selo in Chainsky District

Tula Oblast
As of 2010, eight rural localities in Tula Oblast bear this name:
Andreyevka, Aleksinsky District, Tula Oblast, a village in Solopensky Rural Okrug of Aleksinsky District
Andreyevka, Dubensky District, Tula Oblast, a village in Novopavshinsky Rural Okrug of Dubensky District
Andreyevka, Kimovsky District, Tula Oblast, a village in Rumyantsevsky Rural Okrug of Kimovsky District
Andreyevka, Kurkinsky District, Tula Oblast, a selo in Andreyevskaya Volost of Kurkinsky District
Andreyevka, Suvorovsky District, Tula Oblast, a village in Markovskaya Rural Territory of Suvorovsky District
Andreyevka, Tyoplo-Ogaryovsky District, Tula Oblast, a village in Mosyukovsky Rural Okrug of Tyoplo-Ogaryovsky District
Andreyevka, Venyovsky District, Tula Oblast, a village in Studenetsky Rural Okrug of Venyovsky District
Andreyevka, Yefremovsky District, Tula Oblast, a village in Stepnokhutorskoy Rural Okrug of Yefremovsky District

Ulyanovsk Oblast
As of 2010, three rural localities in Ulyanovsk Oblast bear this name:
Andreyevka, Cherdaklinsky District, Ulyanovsk Oblast, a selo in Kalmayursky Rural Okrug of Cherdaklinsky District
Andreyevka, Nikolayevsky District, Ulyanovsk Oblast, a selo in Slavkinsky Rural Okrug of Nikolayevsky District
Andreyevka, Terengulsky District, Ulyanovsk Oblast, a village in Krasnoborsky Rural Okrug of Terengulsky District

Vladimir Oblast
As of 2010, two rural localities in Vladimir Oblast bear this name:
Andreyevka, Kovrovsky District, Vladimir Oblast, a village in Kovrovsky District
Andreyevka, Selivanovsky District, Vladimir Oblast, a village in Selivanovsky District

Volgograd Oblast
As of 2010, one rural locality in Volgograd Oblast bears this name:
Andreyevka, Volgograd Oblast, a selo in Alexandrovsky Selsoviet of Zhirnovsky District

Voronezh Oblast
As of 2010, three rural localities in Voronezh Oblast bear this name:
Andreyevka, Nizhnedevitsky District, Voronezh Oblast, a selo in Andreyevskoye Rural Settlement of Nizhnedevitsky District
Andreyevka, Novousmansky District, Voronezh Oblast, a settlement in Trudovskoye Rural Settlement of Novousmansky District
Andreyevka, Podgorensky District, Voronezh Oblast, a selo in Lykovskoye Rural Settlement of Podgorensky District

Yaroslavl Oblast
As of 2010, one rural locality in Yaroslavl Oblast bears this name:
Andreyevka, Yaroslavl Oblast, a village in Zaozersky Rural Okrug of Uglichsky District

See also
Andrey
Andreyev
Andriivka, Kharkiv Oblast, urban-type settlement in Kharkiv Oblast, Ukraine